The 1939 Governor General's Awards for Literary Merit were the fourth rendition of the Governor General's Awards, Canada's annual national awards program which then comprised literary awards alone. The awards recognized Canadian writers for new English-language works published in Canada during 1939 and were presented in 1940. There were no cash prizes.

There was one award in each of three established categories, which recognized English-language works only.

Winners
Fiction: Franklin D. McDowell, The Champlain Road
Poetry or drama: Arthur S. Bourinot, Under the Sun
Non-fiction: Laura G. Salverson, Confessions of an Immigrant's Daughter

References

External links
 

Governor Genreral's Awards
1939 literary awards
Governor General's Awards